The diocesan governor of Bergen  in Norway was a government agency of the Kingdom of Norway. The title was  before 1919, and in 1919 all stiftamt were abolished in favor of equal counties. 

The  (principal county) of Bergenhus (later simplified to Bergen stiftamt) was established in 1662 by the king. It was originally made up of several subordinate counties: Nordlandenes, Sunnmøre, Søndre Bergenhus, and Nordre Bergenhus. Bergenhus stiftamt was led by a stiftamtmann and the subordinate counties were led by an amtmann. The seat of the stiftamt was the city of Bergen. In 1871, the city of Bergen was split off as a separate amt (county), and the stiftamtmann also assumed the role of Bergen's amtmann until 1918. In 1919, there was a large county reorganization in Norway and every stiftamt was abolished and the counties were renamed .

The diocesan governor is the government's representative in the diocese which was made up of multiple subordinate counties. The governor carries out the resolutions and guidelines of the Storting and government. This is done first by the governor performing administrative tasks on behalf of the ministries. Secondly, the diocesan governor also monitors the activities of the county governors and the municipalities and is the appeal body for many types of municipal decisions.

List of diocesan governors
Bergen stiftamt has had the following governors:

References

Bergen